Heinemann is a German surname.

Geographical distribution
As of 2014, 79.3% of all known bearers of the surname Heinemann were residents of Germany (frequency 1:3,195), 11.1% of the United States (1:102,921), 2.0% of Australia (1:37,205) and 1.5% of Brazil (1:418,225).

In Germany, the frequency of the surname was higher than national average (1:3,195) in the following states:
 1. Thuringia (1:965)
 2. Saxony-Anhalt (1:990)
 3. Lower Saxony (1:1,535)
 4. Bremen (1:2,174)
 5. Hesse (1:2,361)
 6. Hamburg (1:2,724)
 7. Berlin (1:3,012)
 8. North Rhine-Westphalia (1:3,022)

People
 Barbara Heinemann Landmann (1795–1883), Alsatian pietist
 Ed Heinemann (1908–1991), American aircraft designer
 Fritz Heinemann (artist) (1864–1932), German sculptor
 Fritz Heinemann (philosopher) (1889–1970), German philosopher
 Gustav Heinemann (1899–1976), German politician
 Hermann von Heinemann (1812–1871), German entomologist 
 Isaac Heinemann, (1876–1957), Israeli rabbinical scholar and professor
 Josefine Heinemann (born 1998), German chess women grandmaster
 Larry Heinemann (1944–2019), American novelist 
 Margot Heinemann (1913–1992), British writer
 Tim Means (environmentalist) Heinemann (1944–2019), American Mexican Environmentalist
 Moshe Heinemann (born 1935), Orthodox rabbi
 Rudolph J. Heinemann (1901–1975), American art dealer and collector
 Tom Heinemann (born 1987), American soccer player
 Uta Ranke-Heinemann (1927–2021), German theologian
 William Heinemann (1863–1920), founder of Heinemann Publishers

See also 
 Heineman

References

German-language surnames
Jewish surnames